Lim Hak Tai,  (28 May 1893 – 14 February 1963) was one of Singapore's pioneer artist at the turn of the 20th century, and was the person who inspired the Nanyang School of art form, to reflect the 'Nanyang' (South-east Asia) region, both in painting style and subject matter.

Early life and education 
Lim was born on 28 May 1893 in Xiamen, Fujian Province, China. Lim left Xiamen in 1913 to study at Fuzhou, Fujian and graduated from the Fujian Provincial Teachers’ Training College in 1916.

Career 
After graduation, Lim returned to Xiamen and taught at various schools. In 1923, Lim co-founded the Xiamen Academy of Fine Arts with two other artists.

Lim came to Singapore at the outbreak of Second Sino-Japanese War in 1937, and taught art at The Chinese High School and Nan Chiau Girls High School for a year. In 1938, Lim and other artists founded Nanyang Academy of Fine Arts and he was appointed as its principal

Lim was a dedicated art educator and an accomplished painter in Singapore, and have taught many art students - some on to becoming accomplished Singaporean artists. He was also the first to articulate the notion of a 'Nanyang style' art that involved local and South-east Asian tropical representations using Western painting techniques. As such, Lim persuaded his peers Cheong Soo Pieng, Chen Wen Hsi, Chen Chong Swee and Liu Kang to seek inspiration from their Balinese excursion in 1952, developing what is known today as the Nanyang School of Painting.

Lim was conferred with the Sijil Kemuliaan (Certificate of Honour) for his outstanding achievements for the Academy, and the society on 3 June 1962. He was the first artist to be conferred the award by the Singapore Government. Lim died on 14 February 1963 due to lung cancer.

Gallery

See also 
 Chen Chong Swee
 Cheong Soo Pieng
 Liu Kang
 Georgette Chen

References

Further reading 
 History of Nanyang Academy of Fine Arts
 NAFA Alumni Association
 Pameran retrospektif pelukis-pelukis Nanyang : Muzium Seni Negara Malaysia 26hb. Okt. - 23hb. Dis. 1979 (Nanyang artists retrospective exhibition : National Arts Museum of Malaysia 26 October - 23 December 1979) (art catalogue)

1893 births
1963 deaths
Deaths from lung cancer
Deaths from cancer in Singapore
Singaporean artists
Singaporean people of Hokkien descent
20th-century Singaporean painters
Chinese emigrants to British Malaya